The Taman Suntex station is a Mass Rapid Transit (MRT) station that serves the suburb of Taman Suntex in Cheras, Selangor, Malaysia. It serves as one of the stations on Klang Valley Mass Rapid Transit (KVMRT) Kajang Line. The station is located at 702 Hulu Langat interchange and Batu 9 Toll Plaza (Kajang-bound) of the  Cheras–Kajang Expressway, as well as Taman Suntex.

Station Background

Station Layout 
The station adopts the standard elevated station design of the MRT Kajang Line with two levels. However, unlike most of the elevated stations, the station has an island platform with two sides above the concourse level. Other stations which have similar layout are Sungai Buloh, Phileo Damansara and Kajang MRT stations.

Exits and entrances 
The station has only one entrance. The feeder buses operate from the station's feeder bus hub via Entrance A within the station area.

Bus Services

Feeder bus services 
With the opening of the MRT Kajang Line, feeder buses also began operating linking the station with several housing areas and villages around the Taman Suntex area. The feeder buses operate from the station's feeder bus hub accessed via Entrance A of the station.

Other Bus Services 
The MRT Taman Suntex station also provides accessibility for some other bus services.

The bus stop is located near the Jalan Taman Suntex - Jalan Kijang traffic light junction. It requires around 500 meters walking distance to reach the station.

See also
 Sungai Buloh-Kajang Line

References

External links

Taman Suntex MRT Station | mrt.com.my
 RapidKL Prasarana Malaysia Berhad

Hulu Langat District
Rapid transit stations in Selangor
Sungai Buloh-Kajang Line
Railway stations opened in 2017